The 2011 Rallye de France – Alsace was the eleventh round of the 2011 World Rally Championship season. The rally took place over 30 September – 2 October, and was based in Strasbourg, the capital city of the Alsace region of France. The rally was also the seventh round of the Super 2000 World Rally Championship, and the fifth round of the WRC Academy.

Sébastien Ogier took his fifth WRC win of the season, having taken the rally lead on the second day after battling with Dani Sordo and Petter Solberg. His victory also moved him to within three points of his team-mate and drivers' championship leader Sébastien Loeb, after Loeb's retirement on day one due to an engine problem. Sordo took Mini's best result since their return to the sport, in second position with Solberg completing the podium on-the-road.

Solberg was later disqualified from the event after his car was found to be underweight, promoting Mikko Hirvonen to the podium, and with the three extra points gained, into a tie with Loeb for the championship lead. Jari-Matti Latvala finished fourth, ahead of Dennis Kuipers, who took the best WRC result for a Dutch driver. Ott Tänak won the SWRC class for the third time in 2011, and Alastair Fisher took a maiden win in the WRC Academy.

Results

Event standings

† – The WRC Academy featured the first two days of the rally.

Special stages

Power Stage
The "Power stage" was a live, televised  stage at the end of the rally, held in Haguenau.

Standings after the race

Drivers' Championship standings

Constructors' Championship standings

 Bold Text indicates World Champion.
 Note: Only the top five positions are included for both sets of standings.

References

External links 

 Results at eWRC.com

France
Rally
Rallye de France Alsace